Charley Woods is a   nature reserve north of Copt Oak in Leicestershire. It is owned and managed by the Leicestershire and Rutland Wildlife Trust. It consists of Cat Hill Wood and Burrow Wood, with a field between them.

These ancient woods are dominated by pedunculate oak, with sparse ground flora. There is a considerable amount of dead wood, which attracts a variety of birds, including all three native species of woodpecker.

There is access by a track from the Whitwick Road.

References

Leicestershire and Rutland Wildlife Trust